Tearaway, tear away, tear-away or variant may refer to:

Fiction 
 Tearaway Magazine, youth lifestyle magazine
 "Torn Away", short story by Joe R. Lansdale from Twilight Zone: 19 Original Stories on the 50th Anniversary
 Tearaway (video game), a 2013 adventure video game for the PlayStation Vita
Tearaway Unfolded, a 2015 expanded remake for the PlayStation 4

Music 
 "Tear Away", Drowning Pool nu metal single
 "Tearing Away", death metal song from the fifth studio album of Sadist